Jakov Sedlar (born 6 November 1952) is a Croatian film director and producer. A former cultural attaché during the 1990s in the Franjo Tuđman government, his documentaries promote Croatian nationalist views through propaganda. His 2016 documentary Jasenovac – The Truth sparked controversy and condemnation for downplaying and denying the crimes committed at the Jasenovac concentration camp by the Ustaše during World War II, instead focusing on crimes supposedly committed against Croats by communist Partisans at the camp following the war, while using alleged misinformation and forgeries to present its case, in addition to naming former and current Croatian officials, intellectuals, historians and journalists it dubs as "Yugoslav nationalists concealing the truth".

Biography 
Sedlar was born in Split, SR Croatia, Yugoslavia in 1952. In 1972, he moved to Zagreb, where he studied South Slavic languages, Western literature and philosophy at the University of Zagreb. After his graduation in 1977, he enrolled in the Academy of Dramatic Arts and studied theatre and film directing, graduating in 1981.

Sedlar was the Croatian Government's "official propagandist" during the Yugoslav Wars of the 1990s, according to the historian Vjekoslav Perica. Sedlar became known for films such as Gospa and Četverored, which portray the events of World War II and the Cold War from a Croatian nationalist perspective. He also made a number of documentaries glorifying wartime President Franjo Tuđman and his party, the right-wing Croatian Democratic Union (HDZ). In an apparent bid to increase their credibility abroad, several were filmed in the English language, with actor Martin Sheen narrating. In 1996, Tuđman persuaded him to accept the post of the first cultural attaché in the United States (New York), where he remained until 2000. During that time, he launched various projects and organized numerous events to promote Croatian culture. Joe Tripician, who was hired to write the official biography of Tuđman and co-directed the documentary Tudjman with Sedlar (though Tripician claims he barely worked on the film and was shocked when he saw his name on it), describes Sedlar as the "Leni Riefenstahl of Croatia — but without the talent."

After his return from the United States in 2000, the newly elected coalition government demoted Sedlar.

Controversies

Sedlar was criticized for nationalism and politicization in his films. On 4 April 2016, his documentary Jasenovac – The Truth premiered. The documentary is about the alleged crimes committed by the communist authorities of the FPR Yugoslavia in the Jasenovac concentration camp between 1945 and 1951 following the World War II, which, as claimed in the documentary, were covered up. The film also downplays and denies the extent of the Holocaust in the Independent State of Croatia, as well as the World War II-era genocide of Serbs, contending that the number of victims were exaggerated through post-war Yugoslavian communist propaganda. At the end of the documentary, Sedlar leaves the alleged communist crimes, moves to the modern era and mentions various leftists who allegedly "cover up communist crimes" (naming Presidents Stjepan Mesić and Ivo Josipović, and Serb MP Milorad Pupovac) as well as various journalists who allegedly help them (Miljenko Jergović, Jurica Pavičić, Ante Tomić, Davor Butković and others), which was considered tendentious and irrelevant to the theme of the documentary, as well as a way of labeling people he considered inadequate. Slavko Goldstein said that the documentary was "full of half-truths, lies and forgeries", and that the end in which some public figures are named was a "direct arrest warrant and indictment against individuals."

Vladimir Matijanić wrote for the Slobodna Dalmacija that the documentary "does not prove that after the liberation, the Partisans carried out mass executions of the prisoners, or that the Jasenovac concentration camp was solely 'working and internment camp'" (as claimed in the documentary). Another controversy connected to the documentary is the alleged title in the Vjesnik newspaper from 1945 stating that corpses tossed into the Sava were reaching Zagreb from the direction of Jasenovac. Shortly after the premiere, journalist Lovro Krnić went through the Zagreb state archives and examined all the May 1945 issues of Vjesnik and found that no such headline existed. Upon closer inspection, Krnić discovered that the headline seen in the documentary had been crudely doctored, likely using Photoshop. Attorney Veljko Miljević stated that Sedlar could end up in prison due to charges of falsification, denial of crime and hate speech against politicians and journalists.

In April 2017, the Simon Wiesenthal Center sent a letter to the Zagreb City Council it had received from Robert Rozett, the director of the Yad Vashem libraries. In it, Rozett apparently noted that having the films in the Visual Center is in no way an endorsement of their content. The Simon Wiesenthal Center urged the Zagreb City Council to deny Sedlar an award from the city, which was partially based on his films being available through Yad Vashem. Yad Vashem's apparent distancing from Sedlar did not deter him from continuing to use this example to legitimize the historic value of his work.

Legal issues
In 2000, a police investigation was launched into several criminal offenses allegedly perpetrated by Sedlar. In an influential magazine, Nacional, Sedlar was described as "a publicly denounced forger, fraudster, manipulator and financial broker". In 2004, he was charged with evasion of prolonged parking ticket fines worth approximately HRK30,000 at the time (≈US$5,000). In 2018, Australia annulled his previously issued visa.

Filmography

Feature films 
U sredini mojih dana (1988)
Gospa (1995)
Don't Forget Me (1996)
Agonija (1998)
Remembrance of Georgia (1998)
File of Four (1999)
Mercy of the Sea (2003) co-directed with Dominik Sedlar
Duhovi (2018)
The Match (2021) co-directed with Dominik Sedlar
The Conversation (2022)

Docudramas 
Syndrome Jerusalem (2004)
Café Auschwitz (2009)

Documentaries 

Mijo (1980)
Hvalen budi – Blessed Be (1981)
Hrvatski Božić – Croatian Christmas (1981)
Hrvatska naivna umjetnost – Croatian Naïve Art (1984)
Međugorje, Gospi u pohode – Medjugorje, Visiting the Madonna (1984)
Sakralna umjetnost u Hrvata – Sacral Art in Croatia (1985)
Jordan (1985)
Lijepa naša – Our Beautiful Homeland (1986)
Vedro podnebesje – Clear Skies (1986)
Jeste li bili u Zagrebu, gospodine Lumiere – Have you been to Zagreb, Mr Lumiere (1987)
Hrvatska i Hrvati – Croatia and the Croats (1988)
Stepinac-znak vremena – Stepinac: Sign of the Times (1988)
Jugoslavenska armija i srpski teroristi – The Yugoslav Army and Serbian Terrorists (1991)
Krvavi Uskrs – Bloody Easter (1991)
Nepoznati dio Holokausta, Srbija 1941-1945 – The Unknown Holocaust, Serbia 1941-1945 (1992)
Hrvatska - Croatia (1996)
Mozart of Basketball (1996)
Tuđman – hrvatski George Washington – Tudjman: Croatian George Washington (1997)
Židovi i Hrvatska – The Jews and Croatia (1998)
Anđeli rata – Angels of War (1998)
To je put – This Is the Way (1999)
Mostovi sjećanja – Bridges of Memories (1999)
Almira (2001)
Brač, Dalmacija, Hrvatska – Brač, Dalmatia, Croatia (2002)
Sudbina mi nije dala da odem – Fate Did not Let Me Go (2002)
Hrvatske katedrale – Croatian Cathedrals (2003)
Slavenska (2003)
Hrvatsko narodno kazalište u Zagrebu – The Croatian National Theatre in Zagreb (2003)
Yudith (2005)
Kad mrtvi glasuju – When the Dead Vote (2006)
Petnaest do osam – Fifteen to Eight (2006)
Maestro (2007)
Lav koji plače – The Weeping Lion (2007)
Mayim, Mayim (2007)
Nema više heroja – No More Heroes (2007)
Sinjska Alka (2007)
Židovi i Ukrajina – The Jews and Ukraine (2008)
Vizija u pustinji – Vision in the Desert (2008))
Letica (2008)
Đapić (2008)
Hrvatska, ljubavi moja – Croatia, My Love (2008)
Tražeći Orsona – Searching for Orson (2008)
Šparemblek (2009)
Lika ili Gospićko-senjska biskupija – Lika or Diocese of Gospić-Senj (2009)
Gotovac (2009)
Tuđman (2009)
Pravednik Stepinac – Righteous Stepinac (2009)
Pavelić bez maske – Pavelić Unmasked (2010)
Tito bez maske – Tito Unmasked (2010)
Yulia (2010)
Hrvatska, tugo moja  - Croatia, My Sorrow (2010)
Ruža (2010)
Istra ili Porečko-pulska biskupija – Istra or Diocese of Poreć-Pula (2010)
Bošković (2011)
Bitka za Dajlu – Fight for Dajla (2011)
Nije moja duša prazna – My Soul Is Not Empty (2011)
Židovi i Hrvatska – Jews and Croatia (2011)
Hrvati i njihovi franjevci u USA i Canadi – The Croats and their Franciscans in Canada and the USA (2011)
Hrvati i Srbi, povijest jedne averzije – The Croats and the Serbs: The History of an Aversion (2011)
Hrvatska katolička župa sv. Ćirila i Metoda u New Yorku – The Croatian Parish of Sts. Cyril & Methodius in New York (2012)
Ljubav koja ne poznaje granica – The Love that Knows no Boundaries (2012)
Glasonoša promjena – Herald of Change (2012)
Tko želi ubiti Juliju Timošenko – Who Wants to Kill Yulia Tymoshenko (2012)
Požega (2013)
Trčeći za svjetlom – Chasing the Light (2013)
Julija, ona koja se nikada ne predaje – Yulia, Who Never Gives Up (2014)
Hrvatski klubovi Geelong i Footscray – Croatian Clubs Geelong and Footscray (2014)
Jasenovac – The Truth (2015)
Povijest zagrebačkog športa – The History of Sports in Zagreb (2016)
Anne Frank-nekad i danas – Anne Frank: Then and Now (2016)
Pravednica Ciganka – The Righteous Gypsy (2016)
Snaga tišine – Power of Silence (2016)
Nisam se bojao umrijeti – I Was Not Afraid To Die (2016)
Svetac, zločinac i dvorske lude – The Saint, the Criminal and the Court Jesters (2017)
Requiem for the World (2017)

References

Sources

External links 
 
 

1952 births
Living people
Croatian film directors
Croatian documentary film directors
Croatian Holocaust deniers
Deniers of the genocide of Serbs in the Independent State of Croatia
Film people from Split, Croatia
Cultural attachés
Croatian propagandists